Riss Lake is a small reservoir in the center of the neighborhood Riss Lake, in Parkville, Platte County, Missouri. Forests surround it, and it is bordered on one side by a highway, two sides by the neighborhood Riss Lake and on the last side by the Parkville Nature Reservation. The neighborhood Riss Lake has several pools, a park, a basketball court, a volleyball court and tennis courts. The lake was originally much smaller until a dam was built.

External links

Reservoirs in Missouri
Protected areas of Platte County, Missouri
Buildings and structures in Platte County, Missouri
Bodies of water of Platte County, Missouri